James Hollis Rutherford (September 26, 1886 – September 18, 1956) was a Major League Baseball center fielder who played for one season. He played for the Cleveland Naps for one game on July 12 during the 1910 Cleveland Naps season. He attended Cornell University.

References

External links

1886 births
1956 deaths
Major League Baseball center fielders
Cornell Big Red baseball players
Cleveland Naps players
Baseball players from Minnesota
Portland Beavers players